Walter Schimana (12 March 1898 – 12 September 1948) was an Austrian functionary in the German SS during the Nazi era. He was SS and Police Leader in the occupied Soviet Union in 1942 and Higher SS and Police Leader in occupied Greece from October 1943. Responsible for numerous war crimes and atrocities in the occupied territories, Schimana was arrested by the Allies after the war and committed suicide while awaiting trial.

SS career 

Schimana became an early member of the Nazi Party (NSDAP), on 7 December 1926 (Party-Nr. 49042), and joined the paramilitary SA in Munich. After the Nazis came to national power, in 1934 he joined the uniformed Protection Police (Schutzpolizei) with the rank of captain. In 1936, Schimana was transferred to the Gendarmerie as a major. After the Anschluss, he was transferred to the Police Headquarters at Vienna as Commander of the motorized Gendarmerie for Austria. On 15 August 1939, he joined the SS with the rank of Standartenführer. At the outbreak of the war in Europe, he took over command of a field gendarmerie battalion in Poland, France then General Government (Poland) up to 1940. He held command of various schools of the motorized gendarmerie then staff duties into Main Office for the Order Police from 1940 to 1941.

World War II and atrocities 

On 4 September 1941, he was appointed SS and Police Leader (SSPF) for the Saratov area, and later attached to the staff of the Higher SS and Police Leader (HSSPF) for Central Russia until July 1942, taking part in rear-security operations. From 21 July 1942 to 15 July 1943 he was SSPF of Belarus, with headquarters at Minsk. Reporting to Friedrich Jeckeln, he was responsible for the formation of the Schutzmannschaft (collaborationist police) battalions. Subsequently, he underwent training as a divisional commander and was appointed commander of the newly formed SS Division Galicia until October 1943.

On 18 October, Schimana was appointed HSSPF for Greece, in replacement to Jürgen Stroop, a position he held until the withdrawal of German forces from the country in September–October 1944. He became actively engaged in carrying out the persecution of Greek Jews and the campaign against the Greek Resistance movement. In this capacity, he was instrumental in the formation of the infamous "Security Battalions". After the German withdrawal, he was appointed HSSPF of the Danube Sector, which had its headquarters in Vienna. He remained in that position until the German capitulation.

Arrest and suicide
After Germany's capitulation, Schimana was arrested by the Allies. He committed suicide before he was brought to trial.

See also
Bandenbekämpfung

References 

1898 births
1948 suicides
German occupation of Greece during World War II
Nazis who committed suicide in prison custody
Sturmabteilung officers
SS and Police Leaders
Holocaust perpetrators in Russia
Holocaust perpetrators in Ukraine
Holocaust perpetrators in Belarus
Holocaust perpetrators in Greece
People from Austrian Silesia
People from Opava
Austro-Hungarian military personnel of World War I
Nazis who committed suicide in Austria
Waffen-SS personnel
SS-Gruppenführer
Police of Nazi Germany
20th-century Freikorps personnel